Palmito is a town and municipality located in the Sucre Department, northern Colombia.

References
 Gobernacion de Sucre - Palmito
 Palmito official website

Sucre